Bloomfield is a town in Walworth County, Wisconsin,  United States. The population was 1,778 at the 2020 census. The village of Bloomfield was formed from part of the town on December 20, 2011. The census-designated place of Lake Ivanhoe and unincorporated community of North Bloomfield are located in the town.

Geography
According to the United States Census Bureau, the town has a total area of 33.4 square miles (86.4 km2), of which, 32.6 square miles (84.3 km2) of it is land and 0.8 square miles (2.1 km2) of it (2.46%) is water.

Demographics

As of the census of 2000, there were 5,537 people, 2,067 households, and 1,448 families residing in the town. The population density was 170.1 people per square mile (65.7/km2). There were 2,476 housing units at an average density of 76.0 per square mile (29.4/km2). The racial makeup of the town was 94.93% White, 1.95% African American, 0.11% Native American, 0.34% Asian, 0.04% Pacific Islander, 1.17% from other races, and 1.46% from two or more races. Hispanic or Latino of any race were 3.97% of the population.

There were 2,067 households, out of which 35.8% had children under the age of 18 living with them, 54.9% were married couples living together, 10.7% had a female householder with no husband present, and 29.9% were non-families. 24.4% of all households were made up of individuals, and 9.5% had someone living alone who was 65 years of age or older. The average household size was 2.65 and the average family size was 3.16.

In the town, the population was spread out, with 28.6% under the age of 18, 6.3% from 18 to 24, 32.2% from 25 to 44, 21.4% from 45 to 64, and 11.5% who were 65 years of age or older. The median age was 36 years. For every 100 females, there were 98.6 males. For every 100 females age 18 and over, there were 98.3 males.

The median income for a household in the town was $42,232, and the median income for a family was $45,856. Males had a median income of $36,884 versus $25,131 for females. The per capita income for the town was $19,302. About 6.8% of families and 8.3% of the population were below the poverty line, including 9.1% of those under age 18 and 10.2% of those age 65 or over.

Notable people 

 Alfred H. Abell, farmer, town official, and Wisconsin State Representative, lived in the town
 Timothy Fellows, farmer, town and county official, and Wisconsin State Representative, who helped the Underground Railroad smuggle escaped slaves out of the country
 Edwin Kull, farmer, educator, and Wisconsin State Representative, was born in the town

References

External links
Village of Bloomfield website

Towns in Walworth County, Wisconsin
Towns in Wisconsin